Frank K. Schmitz (September 4, 1945 – September 3, 1966) was an American trampoline gymnast who won four individual NCAA titles and a silver medal at the 1965 Trampoline World Championships.

Early life
Schmitz was the son of William C. and Polly Schmitz and was raised in Lafayette, Louisiana. He had several accidents as a child. As a baby, Frank's stroller rolled off the front porch of his house. As a boy he found a live bullet that he put in a toy gun. The bullet exploded and part of it lodged in his liver. As a teenager, Schmitz was involved in a motor scooter accident. A head injury from the accident caused his head to swell to one and a half times its normal size. After Schmitz recovered, his parents pushed him away from contact sports, so he became interested in gymnastics.

High school
After taking up gymnastics he studied under Jeff Hennessy at the University of Southwestern Louisiana while he was in high school.  In 1962, he won the AAU trampoline national championship.  He came in second in Trampolining at the same event in 1963.

While still in high school, Schmitz won the U.S. Invitational Championship in trampoline, floor exercise, and vaulting in 1962.  In 1963 and 1964, he won the East-West Trampoline Championship.  He also attended the 1964 inaugural South African Games where he won the trampoline championship.

College
He began attending college at Southern Illinois University Carbondale where he was a member of Sigma Pi fraternity.  While at SIU he won four individual NCAA national championships.  In 1965, he won the Floor Exercise as well as the Trampoline championships  In 1966, he was again the Floor Exercise champion as well as the Long Horse (Vault)  champion.  In 1966, the SIU Salukis were also the NCAA team champion in men’s gymnastics.

Schmitz won a silver medal at the 1965 Trampoline World Championships in London.

Death
Schmitz was killed when the plane he was piloting crashed near Morgan City, Louisiana on the night before his twenty-first birthday.  At the time of his death he was rated one of the best trampolinists in the world. He was also known for being able to perform the full and one and a half twisting dive roll on the floor exercise and the full twisting front vault on the Long Horse.

After his death he was inducted into the SIU Athletic Hall of Fame.

References 

1945 births
1966 deaths
American male trampolinists
American gymnasts
Southern Illinois University Carbondale alumni
Medalists at the Trampoline Gymnastics World Championships
Aviators killed in aviation accidents or incidents in the United States
Victims of aviation accidents or incidents in 1966
20th-century American people